Glenn Hughes (born 21 August 1951) is an English bassist and singer, best known for playing bass and performing vocals in funk rock band Trapeze and in the Mk. III and IV line-ups of Deep Purple, as well as briefly fronting Black Sabbath in the mid-1980s. He is known by fans as "The Voice of Rock" due to his soulful and wide-ranging singing voice.

In addition to being an active session musician, Hughes also maintains a notable solo career. He currently fronts the supergroups Black Country Communion and The Dead Daisies, and fronted California Breed from 2013 to 2015. In 2016, Hughes was inducted into the Rock and Roll Hall of Fame as a member of Deep Purple.

Early life
Hughes was born in Cannock, Staffordshire, England, on 21 August 1951. He fronted Finders Keepers in the 1960s as bassist/vocalist, as well as the British funk rock band Trapeze. Hughes was bassist and lead vocalist for the first three Trapeze albums, released between 1970 and 1972. He also credited with contributing guitar, piano and trombone to these albums.

Career

Deep Purple, Hughes and Thrall (1973-1982)
Hughes was recruited to replace Roger Glover as bassist in Deep Purple in 1973, though he considered himself more a vocalist than a bassist. He was reportedly uninterested in the Deep Purple job until some of the other members proposed that Paul Rodgers of Free be brought in as co-lead vocalist.

Although the recruitment of Rodgers fell through, Hughes had now become interested in the "two-lead-singer thing", and David Coverdale was later hired as Deep Purple's lead vocalist. The two would ultimately share lead vocal duties in the band for the next three albums, until the break-up of Deep Purple in 1976. Battling a severe cocaine addiction, Hughes then embarked on a solo career, releasing his first solo album in 1977, titled Play Me Out. In 2016, Hughes was inducted into the Rock and Roll Hall of Fame as a member of Deep Purple.

In 1982, he joined with ex-Pat Travers guitarist Pat Thrall to form Hughes/Thrall, and they released one self-titled album which went virtually unnoticed at the time. Part of the reason for the album's obscurity was the inability to support it with a proper tour, due to both parties suffering from drug addiction. As Hughes stated in a 2007 interview, "The Hughes-Thrall album was a brilliant, brilliant album, but we only did 17 shows because we were too loaded."

Gary Moore, Black Sabbath and health problems (1983-1990)

In the mid-1980s, Hughes recorded several different albums with bands and artists including Phenomena (Phenomena, Phenomena II: Dream Runner), Gary Moore (Run for Cover), and Black Sabbath (Seventh Star; originally a solo album by Sabbath guitarist Tony Iommi that was released as a Sabbath album due to record label pressure).

Hughes' health problems due to overeating, drugs and alcohol began to seriously affect his musical projects and this contributed to very short stints with Gary Moore and Tony Iommi, as Hughes was unable to tour with them properly due to his bad health. In 1985 Black Sabbath reunited with original vocalist Ozzy Osbourne for their one-off Live Aid performance. While waiting for a break in Osbourne's career, Iommi decided to record a solo album and Hughes was brought in to provide the vocals. Due to the aforementioned contractual obligations with the record company, the album was credited to Black Sabbath featuring Tony Iommi and released in 1986 to generally positive critical reviews. While touring to promote the new album, Glenn was replaced by vocalist Ray Gillen after just six shows; this was due both to injury from a confrontation with Black Sabbath's production manager John Downing, which contributed to a degradation in his voice, and his not being in good physical shape to complete the tour.

Glenn's first bass guitar was a salmon pink, pre-CBS Fender Jazz Bass. During his tenure in Trapeze, he played a Fender Jazz Bass as well as a Rickenbacker 4001 on the Deep Purple albums Burn, Stormbringer, and Come Taste the Band. This Rickenbacker was eventually given to Black Sabbath bassist Geezer Butler, who subsequently used it on the Never Say Die! tour in 1978.

Health recovery and career rejuvenation (1991-2008)

At the end of the decade, Hughes realised his ongoing drug problem was derailing him; a clean, sober and fully rejuvenated Hughes returned by 1991 with the vocal for the hit "America: What Time Is Love?" with The KLF. He also recorded all the vocals for former Europe guitarist John Norum's solo album Face the Truth. He then re-embarked on a solo career that has been his primary focus to date. In 1999, Hughes did a short tribute tour to Tommy Bolin in Texas, with Tommy's brother Johnnie (of Black Oak Arkansas) on drums.

In 2003, Hughes made a guest appearance in the metal opera project "AINA", alongside other guest vocalists like Michael Kiske, Tobias Sammet, Andre Matos, and Simone Simons on the debut album Days of Rising Doom.

In 2005 Hughes released Soul Mover supporting it with a European tour. He also collaborated with Black Sabbath guitarist Tony Iommi on the 2005 album Fused. Hughes then released Music for the Divine in 2006, which featured Red Hot Chili Peppers members Chad Smith and John Frusciante. Hughes toured in support of the album throughout Europe in autumn 2006.

Live in Australia, an acoustic CD and companion DVD of a performance at Sydney's famous "Basement" club was released via Edel Records on 17 November 2007. The album First Underground Nuclear Kitchen was released on 9 May 2008 in Europe and on 12 May in the rest of the world.

Autobiography and other projects (2009-2016)
In 2009, Hughes formed Black Country Communion with Jason Bonham (drums), Joe Bonamassa (guitar) and Derek Sherinian (keyboards). The band released three albums through 2012 and disbanded in March 2013 following the departure of guitarist Bonamassa. Black Country Communion reunited in 2016 and released a fourth album in 2017.

In July 2010, Hughes appeared as a guest vocalist (together with singer Jørn Lande) fronting Heaven & Hell at the High Voltage Rock Festival in London as a tribute to the late Ronnie James Dio.

Hughes' autobiography was published in May 2011 by British specialist limited edition publishers Foruli. The book, titled Deep Purple and Beyond: Scenes from the Life of a Rock Star, was co-written with author Joel McIver and featured contributions by Tony Iommi, David Coverdale, Ozzy Osbourne, and Tom Morello, as well as a foreword by Lars Ulrich of Metallica. An extended paperback edition, retitled Glenn Hughes: The Autobiography, was published in late 2011 by Jawbone Press.

On 13 September 2012, Hughes and Derek Sherinian met Bako Sahakyan, the president of the breakaway Nagorno-Karabakh Republic and organised a concert in Stepanakert.
In 2013, Hughes made a special guest appearance on the debut, self-titled album from Device. He is featured on the song "Through It All" accompanying David Draiman on vocals.

Hughes has been touring as a member of Kings of Chaos, performing lead vocals, backing vocals and acoustic guitars, since early 2013. In late 2013, he formed a new band called California Breed with drummer Jason Bonham and guitarist Andrew Watt. The group released one self-titled album in 2014. California Breed announced in 2015 that they had broken up.

During 2015, Hughes undertook a solo world tour, featuring guitarist Doug Aldrich and drummer Pontus Engborg. The next year, he released his most recent studio album, Resonate.

The Dead Daisies (2019–present)
In September 2019, supergroup the Dead Daisies debuted a new track, "Righteous Days", on Planet Rock Radio in the UK. It was also announced that Glenn Hughes would be joining the collective as lead singer and bassist. The then current incarnation of the Dead Daisies featured guitarist Doug Aldrich, drummer Deen Castronovo, bassist and singer Glenn Hughes and rhythm guitarist David Lowy.

In November, the band headed to the south of France to begin writing and recording the next album, which would be the first with Glenn Hughes. They spent two weeks in November then a further two weeks in December at La Fabrique Studios in Saint-Rémy de Provence (south of France) working with producer Ben Grosse. The new album was to be released in 2020.

At the beginning of 2020, finishing touches and final mixing of the next album was completed with producer Ben Grosse. In February, a European tour starting at the end of May 2020 and stretching until well into July was announced but later postponed due to the COVID-19 pandemic. In June it was announced that the band would be playing a few shows with Foreigner in Germany and Poland starting in Hamburg on 6 June 2021. In addition, it was announced that the band would also do a number of dates in Europe in summer 2021 with Judas Priest. 

On 17 April, "Unspoken", the first single from the forthcoming album, was released. On 15 May US dance duo Dance With The Dead released a remix version of "Unspoken". On 17 July 2020 The Lockdown Sessions EP was released by the band on digital platforms. The band later announced that the release of Holy Ground, as well as a supporting tour, had been pushed back to 22 January 2021. The next single to be released by the band was "Bustle and Flow" on 25 September. The song reached 15 on the Billboard Mainstream Rock Chart. On 4 December the next single, "Holy Ground", which is also the title track of the forthcoming album, was released and was added to the Planet Rock 'A' playlist.

2021 saw the release of the fifth studio album Holy Ground. The album came out on 22 January and was met with global praise from both fans and music critics featuring 11 songs including three singles to date, the album reached the top 10 on many international rock charts. The next day drummer Deen Castronovo announced that he had left the band, due to a future minor back surgery. In his place for future live shows he will be replaced by Tommy Clufetos, formerly in the band as a session man.

In September 30 2022 the band released Radiance, their newest studio LP. Featuring a return of Glenn Hughes on bass & vocals and this time, Brian Tichy on drums replacing Tommy Clufetos. Once again the album received praise from fans and critics alike, which featured the singles 'Face Your Fear' and 'Radiance'.

Discography

 Play Me Out (1977)
 L.A. Blues Authority Volume II: Glenn Hughes – Blues (1993)
 From Now On... (1994)
 Feel (1995)
 Addiction (1996)
 The Way It Is (1999)
 Return of Crystal Karma (2000)
 A Soulful Christmas (2000)
 Building the Machine (2001)
 Songs in the Key of Rock (2003)
 Soul Mover (2005)
 Music for the Divine (2006)
 First Underground Nuclear Kitchen (2008)
 Resonate (2016)

References

External links

 Official website

1951 births
Living people
20th-century English male singers
20th-century English singers
21st-century English male singers
21st-century English singers
Black Country Communion members
Black Sabbath members
Blues rock musicians
Deep Purple members
English Christians
English expatriates in the United States
English funk musicians
English heavy metal bass guitarists
English heavy metal singers
English rock bass guitarists
Male bass guitarists
English rock singers
English male singer-songwriters
English soul singers
Finders Keepers (band) members
People from Cannock
The Gary Moore Band members
Trapeze (band) members
Heaven & Hell (band) members
California Breed members
Frontiers Records artists
Pony Canyon artists
Brazen Abbot members